Pabstiella campestris is a species of orchid plant.

References 

campestris